Francisco Martínez Tous (born 1 May 1964), known professionally as Paco Tous, is a Spanish actor. He is best known for his starring roles as Paco in the television series Los hombres de Paco (2005–2010; 2021) and as Agustín "Moscow" Ramos in the television series La casa de papel, which premiered in 2017.

Early life 
Tous was born in the Spanish city of Seville and raised in El Puerto de Santa María (Cádiz).

Personal life 
Tous is a member of the Brotherhood of the Virgin of Hope of Macarena.

He was awarded the Medal of Andalusia in 2018.

He has two children, a boy and a girl.

Filmography

Film

Television

Awards and nominations

References

External links

1964 births
Living people
People from Seville
Spanish male film actors
Spanish male television actors
Spanish Roman Catholics
20th-century Spanish male actors
21st-century Spanish male actors
Male actors from Andalusia